Linda Dörendahl (born ) is a German female volleyball player. She is part of the Germany women's national volleyball team.

She participated in the 2015 FIVB Volleyball World Grand Prix.
On club level she played for USC Münster in 2015.

References

1984 births
Living people
German women's volleyball players
Place of birth missing (living people)